Irreligion in Nigeria is measured at less than one percent of the population. As in many parts of Africa, there is a great amount of stigma attached to being an atheist.

A 2010 poll by Pew Research Center showed that 51% of Nigerian Muslims agree with the death penalty for leaving Islam. In some parts of Nigeria, there are even anti-blasphemy laws.

In 2017 the Humanist Association of Nigeria gained formal government recognition after a 17-year struggle.  This was followed by recognition of the Atheist Society of Nigeria, the Northern Nigerian Humanist Association and the Nigerian Secular Society.
It is considered more polite to use the term 'free thinker' when referring to an atheist. Example:  Are you a Muslim, a Christian, or a 'free thinker’?

List of Non-Religious Nigerians 

 Bisi Alimi
 Leo Igwe
 Seun Kuti
 Seun Osewa 
 Mubarak Bala
 Tai Solarin 
 Wole Soyinka

See also
 Religion in Nigeria
 Christianity in Nigeria
 Islam in Nigeria
 Demographics of Nigeria
 Sharia in Nigeria

References

Religion in Nigeria
Nigeria
Nigeria